Harold Wood is a suburban development in the London Borough of Havering.

Harold Wood may also refer to:

Landmarks in Harold Wood:
Harold Wood railway station, a railway station at Harold Wood in the London Borough of Havering in east London
Harold Wood Hospital, a hospital in London, United Kingdom

People 
Harold Wood (weightlifter) (1889–1954), British Olympic weightlifter
Harold Wood (minister) (1896–1989), Australian Uniting Church minister
D'Arcy Wood (minister) (Harold D'Arcy Wood, born 1936), his son, minister of the Uniting Church in Australia
Harold Kenneth Wood (1906–1972), U.S. federal judge
Harry Wood (athlete), English marathon runner

See also
Harry Wood (disambiguation)

Wood, Harold